Košarkaški klub Crvena zvezda, commonly referred to as KK Crvena zvezda Meridianbet for sponsorship reasons or simply Crvena zvezda, is a men's professional basketball club based in Belgrade, Serbia and the major part of the Red Star multi-sports club. The club is a founding member and shareholder of the Adriatic Basketball Association, and competes in the Serbian League (KLS), the ABA League, and the top-tier Europe-wide EuroLeague.

Crvena zvezda is regarded as one of the most successful clubs in Serbia history; their squads have won 22 National League championships, including 10-in-a-row and current 7-in-a-row sequences. They have played in three different National Leagues since 1945, including the Yugoslav First Federal League (1945–1992), the First League of Serbia and Montenegro (1992–2006) and the Serbian League (2006 onwards). They have also won 11 National Cup titles, 6 Adriatic League Championships, one Adriatic Supercup, and one FIBA Saporta Cup. The club plays domestic home matches in the Aleksandar Nikolić Hall. Zvezda's supporters are known as Delije.

The Zvezda's rise to dominance began in their inaugural season by winning the 1946 Yugoslav Championship. FIBA Hall of Fame player-coach Nebojša Popović and Aleksandar Gec, along with a talented supporting cast of future Hall of Famers Aleksandar Nikolić and Borislav Stanković, would lead Crvena zvezda into the greatest period in club history, winning ten consecutive Yugoslav championships in as many seasons throughout the 1940s and early 1950s. After the retirement of Popović in 1956, Zvezda entered a period of rebuilding. Led by forward Vladimir Cvetković and future FIBA Hall of Fame point guard Zoran Slavnić, Zvezda returned to championship caliber, winning two Yugoslav championships in 1969 and 1972. Crvena zvezda won the only European-wide competition in club history, the FIBA European Cup Winner's Cup in 1974. The club struggled throughout the 1980s with a talented cast led by point guard Zoran Radović and FIBA Hall of Fame coach Ranko Žeravica.

Zvezda again returned to dominance in the 1990s following the dissolution of Yugoslavia and joining the league with Serbian and Montenegrin clubs. Led by guard Saša Obradović, Crvena zvezda won the 1993 and 1994 championships. The club also won one more title in 1998. After winning 15 championships throughout the 20th century, Zvezda, now competing in the Adriatic and the Serbian League, after struggling through the 2000s, rose again to dominance in the late 2010s. The Crvena zvezda squads won seven consecutive Serbian championships (2015–2022) and six Adriatic championships in the same seven-year span.

Zvezda has a notable rivalry with Partizan. The rivalry started immediately after the creation of the two clubs in 1945 and the two clubs have been dominant in domestic basketball since then. The Partizan legends and future Hall of Fame players Dražen Dalipagić and Vlade Divac had their stints with Zvezda in the 1990s.

Crvena zvezda is the only club in the world to have produced two members now in the Hall of Fame (Stanković and Nikolić) and four in the FIBA Hall of Fame (Stanković, Popović, Radomir Šaper, and Nikolić). The four of them have the highest Order of Merit from FIBA.

History

1945–1968: Early years and ten consecutive championship titles
The club was founded on 4 March 1945, as a basketball section of the Crvena zvezda Sports Society. By winning the first of ten consecutive championship titles after the Second World War, the golden age of Crvena zvezda began. No domestic national selection could be imagined without seven or eight Zvezda's players and the first five featured Nebojša Popović, Tullio Rochlitzer, Aleksandar Gec, Ladislav Demšar, and Srđan Kalember. They first played in an open-air court at the Kalemegdan fortress.

1968–1972: Return to success
That long-awaited eleventh title was won in the 1968–69 season, when Crvena zvezda won all six games against Jugoplastika, Zadar and Partizan, therefore proving to be better than all three fierce rivals. Led by Vladimir Cvetković, the title was won by Dragan Kapičić, Zoran Lazarević, Ivan Sarjanović, Ljubodrag Simonović, Srđan Skulić, Zoran Slavnić, Tihomir Pavlović, Nemanja Đurić, Miroslav Todosijević, Dragiša Vučinić and Dubravko Kapetanović. At that time, they were the youngest championship-winning team in Yugoslavian basketball. The twelfth title was won in the 1971–72 season. In the 1970s the club won the Yugoslav Cup three times, and most of the work in those years was done by Slavnić, Simonović, Kapičić, Vučinić, and Živković. This generation of players won two national championships and three national cups.

1972–1990: Continental competitions
Crvena zvezda also had significant international success, having played in five continental cup finals so far. They lost the first European Cup Winners' Cup finals to Italian powerhouse Simmenthal Milano in 1972 by a score of 70–74. Then, in 1974, they defeated Spartak ZJŠ Brno from Czechoslovakia by a score of 86–75. This team's third finals in the European Cup Winners' Cup were lost to Spartak Leningrad by a score of 62–63 in 1975. In the club's first Korać Cup finals, in Paris in 1984, the French Orthez won by a score of 97–73. In the Korać Cup second finals in 1998, Zvezda played two matches with Rielo Mash Verona from Italy; they won the away match, 74–68, but lost at home, 64–73. With the total score being 138–141, they did not win the trophy.

1990–2002: Another comeback
The 1990s started promisingly. Throughout the 1991–92 season, which was the last one in Yugoslavia, Crvena zvezda played some inspired basketball, reaching the play-off finals versus arch-rival Partizan that coached by Željko Obradović won the EuroLeague that season. In a twist of fate, Crvena zvezda was led that season by the legendary Partizan coach Duško Vujošević. Though they lost the finals series, the young Crveno-beli team showed plenty of promise. The thirteenth championship title was won after a gap of no less than 21 years, in 1993. In the fifth match of the play-off finals, Crvena zvezda beat fierce rivals and Pionir Hall co-tenants Partizan. The players who won that championship title are: Saša Obradović, Nebojša Ilić, Zoran Jovanović, Mile Marinković, Nikola Jovanović, Mileta Lisica, Dejan Tomašević, Dragoljub Vidačić, Aleksandar Trifunović, Rastko Cvetković, Slobodan Kaličanin, Predrag Stojaković and Srđan Jovanović. In the next season, Crvena zvezda won its fourteenth national championship title. In the play-off finals, Partizan was beaten by 4–1 overall. The Zvezda won the championship for the fifteenth time in 1998. The main star of that team was without any doubt Yugoslavian national team power forward Milenko Topić, and other influential players were Igor Rakočević, Oliver Popović, and Zlatko Bolić.

2002–2011: "European Red Star" project, struggles
In the early part of 2002, the club got complete new management. Individuals from the political and business milieu close to ruling Democratic Party, such as Živorad Anđelković, Goran Vesić, and Igor Žeželj, took over key positions in the club.

From summer 2002 onward, the project called Evropska Zvezda (The European Red Star) was thought up in order to slowly and methodically return the club on the path of its former glory by achieving results that would see the club play EuroLeague again. To that end, new management hired Slovenian coach Zmago Sagadin who became the Zvezda's organizational centerpiece. In his first season, Sagadin did not actually coach the team (the formal head coach role was given to Aleksandar Trifunović), but he did make all the important personnel decisions from the role of a sporting director. Under Sagadin's guidance, Crvena zvezda entered the Adriatic League (a privately owned regional competition in which he holds ownership stake) for the 2002–03 season. In August 2003, ahead of the 2003–04 season, Sagadin took over the coaching duties formally as well. Despite all the efforts, the club did not manage to win any major trophies in this period, and in November 2004 Sagadin got fired.

In the next couple of years the club struggled to get back on a winning streak, and only managed to win the 2004 and 2006 national cup (Radivoj Korać Cup) finals. The first of them was held in Novi Sad, where Crvena zvezda beat the National Champion Partizan, then the host Vojvodina and, finally, FMP Železnik. All three matches were won in overtime, which is something to remember, especially when it is known that those matches were played without some of the best players, including the team captain Igor Rakočević who missed the final match. Besides Rakočević, the cup was won by Goran Jeretin, Vuk Radivojević, Milan Dozet, Miloš Mirković, Norman Richardson, Milko Bjelica, Aleksandar Đurić, Vladislav Dragojlović, Luka Bogdanović, Čedomir Vitkovac and Aleksej Nešović. The 2006 cup was won in Belgrade when Crvena zvezda won superiorly against Hemofarm Vršac by 80–65. The team was coached by Dragan Šakota and featured the likes of Goran Jeretin, Milan Gurović, Gerrod Henderson, Miroslav Raičević, Larry O'Bannon, Igor Milošević, Vujadin Subotić, Nenad Mišanović, Vladislav Dragojlović, Čedomir Vitkovac, Vuk Radivojević and Pero Antić.

With the failure of the project "European Red Star" in 2008, Slobodan Vučićević became the president of Crvena zvezda and brought new life into the club. Svetislav Pešić became the head coach, and a new team was assembled, including some notable players such as Nemanja Bjelica, Marko Kešelj, Vladimir Štimac, Andre Owens, Lawrence Roberts but the club failed to win a trophy that year, and at the end of the season, both Slobodan Vučićević and Svetislav Pešić left the club.

In the following two seasons, the club experienced a decline and financial problems, which culminated in the 2010–11 season when the club had a budget of only 500.000 euros. Crvena zvezda finished 13th in the Adriatic League, and 5th in the Serbian league, failing to qualify for the Adriatic League the following season.

2011–2017: New era of success and Radonjić's titles
A huge debt of 15 million euros threatened the very existence of the club. The club was saved from bankruptcy when Nebojša Čović became president of KK Crvena Zvezda, merging them with KK FMP. He prepared a plan for financial reorganization. In the first year of his presidency, Svetislav Pešić became a head coach for the second time. Even though the season was without success in the Adriatic League, Pešić managed to bring his team to the finals, eventually losing to a much stronger Partizan team 3–1 in the series. Pešić left the club at the end of the season, and his assistant Milivoje Lazić became the new head coach. Crvena zvezda had big ambitions for the 2012–13 season, bringing back Igor Rakočević for the 3rd time, and signing players such as DeMarcus Nelson, Elton Brown and Boris Savović. But Lazić was fired after only 2 games in the season after losing the games against KK Zadar and KK Split, and Vlada Vukoičić was brought in to replace him. Vukoicic managed to win the Serbian cup and managed to advance to the Last 16 EuroCup stage, but he was sacked as well after a very bad start in the domestic league. Dejan Radonjić replaced him, but he was unable to win the Adriatic League and the Serbian League, losing to Partizan in both finals.

The season of 2013–14 was a historic one for the club, as Crvena zvezda was back in the EuroLeague after 15 years. The club had a very successful season in the European competitions, led by the new signings Charles Jenkins, Blake Schilb, Jaka Blažič and Boban Marjanović and had a record of 4–6 in the group stage of the EuroLeague. This wasn't enough to advance to the knockout phase, but the team did reach the semifinals of the EuroCup. Crvena zvezda was eventually eliminated in the semifinals of the Adriatic league, losing to Cibona, and failed to win the domestic title yet again, losing to Partizan in a series which will be remembered more by incidents and a brawl in game 1.

In the summer of 2014, Crvena zvezda signed Nikola Kalinić and Stefan Jović from Radnički Kragujevac, NBA prospect Nemanja Dangubić, center Maik Zirbes and finalized a huge signing of point guard Marcus Williams. In season 2014–15, the club participated in EuroLeague, winning 6 out of 10 games in regular season, reaching Top 16 and seeing its average home attendance rising to 14483. In the Adriatic league, it set a new record of 20 consecutive victories, ending league competition with score 24–2, losing only to Krka and Partizan. In the playoffs, Zvezda triumphed over Partizan 3–1 in the semifinals, and 3–1 over Cedevita Zagreb in the finals, winning its first trophy in this competition and securing a place in Euroleague in the 2015–2016 season. Zvezda also won Radivoj Korać Cup for the third time in a row. In Basketball League of Serbia, Zvezda entered playoffs with 13 wins and only one lost game. In the semifinals, it defeated Mega Leks 2–0, and in the final triumph over great rival Partizan, 3–0.

The team started preparing for the 2015–16 season by re-signing coach Radonjić and guard Branko Lazić for two years each. Team captain Luka Mitrović extended his contract until summer 2017. Williams, Marjanović, Kalinić, Jenkins, and Blažič left the club, and the roster was reinforced by Sofoklis Schortsanitis, Stefan Nastić, Ryan Thompson and Gal Mekel. From its development team FMP, Zvezda promoted MVP of 2015 FIBA Europe Under-20 Championship, Marko Gudurić. The first part of the season was marked by mixed results and a lot of squad changes. Due to serious injuries of Mitrović and Dangubić, the club brought back Marko Simonović, and later on, landed Quincy Miller. Out-of-form Schortsanitis and Mekel were replaced by Vladimir Štimac and returning Marcus Williams. Mid-season, the club also released Williams and Thompson, replacing them with Vasilije Micić and Tarence Kinsey. Results improved, and Crvena zvezda ended group stage of EuroLeague with a 5–5 score, reaching the third place of Group A, qualifying for Top 16 stage. Successful European season continued as Zvezda ended fourth in Top 16 Group E, with a score of 7 wins and seven losses. In the playoffs, it was stopped by CSKA Moscow, who eventually went on to lift EuroLeague trophy. In ABA league, Zvezda entered playoffs from the second position, facing another EuroLeague team – Cedevita – and, defeating them twice, advanced to final series. In the finals, Zvezda pulled a 3–0 against Mega Leks, defending the ABA league title. Zvezda ended another spectacular season by defending the Serbian league title beating Partizan 3–1 in the finals.

The 2016–17 season saw the Zvezda parting ways with its two-star players, Zirbes and Miller, as well as Kinsey, Štimac and Micić. During the pre-season, the club signed Ognjen Kuzmić, Milko Bjelica and Charles Jenkins, brought talented Petar Rakićević and promoted Ognjen Dobrić from its development team. When the season already began, the club brought on Nate Wolters who was waived by Detroit Pistons. Squad was finally completed mid-season, with the addition of Deon Thompson to the roster. Building on previous years tactics, Zvezda's trademark became its strong, aggressive defense, pressure on the ball, intercepting passes, steals and resulting fast breaks. In January 2017, coach Dejan Radonjić achieved his 200th victory leading Zvezda. He also brought another Radivoj Korać Cup to the team. Zvezda has ended the regular ABA league season with 25 wins on their record while losing only once, which was the best regular-season record made by any team in the history of the regional competition so far. Team narrowly stayed out of Top 8, ending up on 9th place, having the same number of victories as 8th placed Darussafaka, but having worse head-to-head record. However, it decisively defended ABA league trophy, defeating Budućnost (2-1) and Cedevita (3-0) on its way. In the domestic championship, Zvezda ended league part with the score of 13–1, defeated Mega Leks (2-0) and FMP (3-0) in the playoffs, and lifted another trophy.

2017–2020: Continuing success 

During the summer of 2017, the head coach Radonjić didn't sign a new contract, and the club parted ways with no less than eleven players, including key figures in the last couple of years such as Simonović, captain Mitrović, Jenkins, Jović, Kuzmić, and Gudurić. Young prospect Dušan Alimpijević was named as the head coach. Depleted roster was reinforced by James Feldeine and Taylor Rochestie, veterans Pero Antić and Marko Kešelj and a quartet of young players: Mathias Lessort, Nikola Radičević, Stefan Janković and Nikola Jovanović. Zvezda also brought in Dragan Apić, Dejan Davidovac and Stefan Lazarević from its development team FMP. Half of the rebuilt team hasn't previously played a single game in EuroLeague. Breaking with defense-oriented philosophy of Radonjić era, the staple of the Zvezda's game became 3 point shot. In December 2017, the roster was further strengthened with combo guard Dylan Ennis, while Apić and Lazarević got loaned back to FMP. The last player to arrive was Slovenian national team center Alen Omić, while underperforming Radičević parted ways with the club. Zvezda finished first in the regular part of ABA League, having 19 wins and 3 losses, and reached finals by defeating Mornar 2–1 in series, but lost 3–1 in final series to Budućnost. The defeat meant that the club will not participate in EuroLeague next year, which triggered downsizing. Management terminated contract with Dylan Ennis and Milko Bjelica, and reinforced squad with Filip Čović and young prospect Aleksa Radanov from FMP. Poor start in domestic KLS forced coach Alimpijević to resign, and his assistant Milenko Topić took over as interim head coach. The modified team managed to win the Superleague title, beating FMP in the finals, but the season was generally deemed to be unsuccessful due to failure to secure a spot in Euroleague.

Squad rebuilding prior to the 2018–19 season started with signing Milan Tomić as a head coach. Soon to follow were the players Billy Baron, Michael Ojo and two centers from Radonjić era: Maik Zirbes and Dušan Ristić. The Zvezda also added experienced Stratos Perperoglou and Mouhammad Faye, as well as point guard Joe Ragland. The last one to sign was combo guard Nemanja Nenadić from the development team FMP. Zvezda started season well, convincingly winning ABA League Super Cup tournament by beating last season champion Budućnost in the final game. Tomić struck a great balance between hard defense and versatile offense, causing team to grab the first spot at the beginning of ABA League, as well as EuroCup Group A. Bad streak in the EuroCup during November, caused Zvezda to finish the group phase on the third spot, which was still good enough for it to advance to the next stage. In the ABA League, the Zvezda ended the first part of the season with 11–0, having defeated every opponent in the league. Zvezda ended the 2018-19 EuroCup season in Top 16 stage, reaching third out of four places in group G. Mid-February roster was strengthened by signing experienced guard K. C. Rivers. Zvezda entered ABA playoffs from the first position, having 21 win and one loss. In semifinals, Zvezda eliminated Partizan 2-1 despite losing starting playmaker Ragland at the beginning of match one due to a knee injury. In the finals, Zvezda clashed with last year's champions KK Budućnost and defeated them 3–2 in series, despite playing without injured Perperoglou in the last three matches. In the Serbian Super League, the Zvezda won all 10 league games, downed Mega Bemax in playoffs semifinals 2–0, and triumphed over Partizan in final series 3–1. 

Prior to the 2019–20 season, the club extended contracts with Baron, Čović, Dobrić, Faye, Lazić, Boriša Simanić, and Perperoglou, brought back Jenkins and Kuzmić, as well as signed Derrick Brown, James Gist and Lorenzo Brown. Zvezda entered season poorly, getting relegated from ABA Supercup in the first match, losing 2 out of 3 games in ABA and having the same score in Euroleague. Coach Milan Tomić resigned less than a month after the season kicked off, leaving assistant Andrija Gavrilović, who never held a head coach position before, as an interim solution. Gavrilović failed to make any notable progress, which added to the bad atmosphere around the club. Upset by his poor performances, Zvezda fans started booing Filip Čović. Club management reacted at the end of December, hiring Dragan Šakota as a coach and reinforcing squad with Vladimir Štimac and Kevin Punter. Derrick Brown and Mo Faye agreed with the club to terminate their contracts in January. Mid-February Zvezda transferred Čović and Kuzmić to FMP, bringing in Kalin Lucas instead. An outbreak of COVID-19 pandemic brought EuroLeague and ABA seasons to a standstill mid-March. At that point, the Zvezda held 3rd position in ABA with one round left to be played, and the 14th position in EuroLeague, with six rounds remaining. Both competitions ended without a champion, and EuroLeague decided to stick with the same clubs in the next season.

2020–2022: Two triple crowns with Radonjić 
The Zvezda entered the 2020–21 season hiring club's legend Saša Obradović as the new head coach. The club started building the new squad by signing Jordan Loyd, Corey Walden, Langston Hall and Emanuel Terry. Aleksa Radanov, Aleksa Uskoković and Duop Reath got promoted from the development team. Soon after the season start, Zvezda signed Taylor Rochestie on a short-term contract and completed a huge signing of Johnny O'Bryant. However, the team performed below expectations, winning only 5 out of 16 games in Euroleague opening stages and losing in ABA to another title contender KK Budućnost, so coach Obradović and the club decided to part ways. Obradović was replaced by Dejan Radonjić, Zvezda's all-time leader in both regular-season games coached and wins. The club also parted ways with Rochestie and Emanuel Terry and reinforced the squad with Quino Colom and Landry Nnoko. Despite missing five important players due to COVID-19, Zvezda won the Serbian national cup. It was the 10th Radonjić's trophy on Zvezda helm. Right after the cup tournament, Zvezda parted ways with O'Bryant. Soon to follow were departures of Simanić and Colom, as the coach was seeking a way to trim down the roster. Zvezda finished regular part of the ABA league in the first place, with 23 wins and 3 losses. The semifinals duel with KK Igokea was won 2-1 despite struggling with injury problems, most notably the starting playmaker Walden. In the finals, Zvezda triumphed against Budućnost with 3–2 in series, relying once again on Radonjić's trademark aggressive defense. In the Serbian Super League, Zvezda put on a dominant performance on its road to finals, beating in process KK Zlatibor and KK Borac Čačak. In the final series, Zvezda defeated Mega Soccerbet 2–1, despite Walden missing all the games due to back injury and Loyd getting injured in game 1 and missing games 2 and 3. This was the third triple crown under coach Radonjić, and the third one in club's history.

For the 2021–22 season, the club focused on keeping its domestic players base and expanding it by re-signing five of Zvezda's former players: Luka Mitrović, Nate Wolters, Stefan Lazarević, Maik Zirbes and most importantly Nikola Kalinić. Zvezda also added experienced Aaron White and Austin Hollins, as well as the former key player of its rival Budućnost, Nikola Ivanović. Once again putting a heavy emphasis on defense and transition, Zvezda won MagentaSport Cup preseason tournament by beating Panathinaikos and home side Bayern, but Aaron White suffered a broken arm. In November, Zvezda added former Serbia national team point guard Stefan Marković. In February Zvezda won the Serbian national cup, triumphing decisively in the final game over Partizan led by Željko Obradović. The club ended its Euroleague season sharing 9th spot with Baskonia and Alba, having 12 wins and 14 defeats. It also finished regular part of the ABA league in the first place, with 24 wins and 2 losses, securing home court advantage in the playoffs. Zvezda defeated Cedevita Olimpija 2-1 in the semifinals, and triumphed over Partizan 3-2 in the final series, lifting its 6th ABA league trophy. In Serbian Super League playoff, Zvezda knocked out Mega Mozzart (2-1) and defeated FMP in the finals (2-0), completing the fourth triple crown in its history, and fourth under the same coach.

2022–present: Post-Radonjić period 
In the summer of 2022, coach Radonjić decided not to extend the contract with Zvezda. Several key players from the past season followed suit and left the club as well: Kalinić, Wolters, Hollins, Davidovac. Zvezda hired head coach of the Serbia national under-20 team, Vladimir Jovanović. He started building a new squad by signing Zvezda's former star Nemanja Nedović, Ben Bentil, Jaylen Adams and Hassan Martin, added depth with veterans John Holland and Miroslav Raduljica, as well as young Serbian prospects Filip Petrušev and Dalibor Ilić. In October the club completed a major transfer by bringing in Luca Vildoza, and reached a mutual agreement to terminate the contract of underperforming Jaylen Adams. After a poor start in Euroleague (1-6) and an upset loss on a home court to Zadar in ABA league, Zvezda replaced coach Jovanović with Duško Ivanović. Ivanović made an immediate impact with 10 games won in a row, 6 of which in Euroleague. Late in December, Zvezda signed Facundo Campazzo, but was prevented to register him to play the Euroleague until March due to a ban. On-form Vildoza was chosen as the Euroleague MVP for December In February Zvezda won the Serbian national cup, beating Borac, Partizan and Mega in process. It was the first trophy Zvezda won under Duško Ivanović.

Rivalries

Partizan Belgrade

The rivalry between Crvena zvezda and Partizan involves the two biggest and most storied basketball clubs in Serbia.

The two Belgrade-based clubs have won the two highest numbers of national titles in Serbia: Crvena zvezda have won 22, one more than Partizan. Together, they account for 17 of the 48 national titles in Yugoslavia (1945–1992), 11 of 14 national titles in Serbia and Montenegro (1992–2006), and all national titles in Serbia (2006 onwards). Also, the two clubs have won the two highest numbers of championships in the Adriatic League. Together, they account for 12 of 20 championships.

Budućnost Podgorica 

The rivalry between Budućnost and Crvena zvezda is an Adriatic League (ABA League) rivalry. While the two teams have played each other since Budućnost joined the Yugoslav First Basketball League in 1980, their rivalry began to develop in the 1990s through the Serbian-Montenegrin League and reached its peak in the Adriatic League during the late 2010s and early 2020s with 3-in-a-row League Finals (2018, 2019, and 2021).

Identity 
The main colors of Crvena zvezda, since its foundation, are red and white. The crest is a red five-pointed star, white and gold framed, on a red-white shield. In addition, the whole crest is framed with gold color. There are two golden stars on the top of their emblem, symbolizing the 20 national titles won. The typical kit of the team is a shirt with red and white vertical stripes and red or white shorts. Crvena zvezda used also as away kit or third kit, an all-blue jersey, but very rarely, so that the club used all the colors of the Serbian flag.

Sponsors and Manufacturers
Since 1979, Crvena zvezda has a specific kit manufacturer and a kit sponsor. The following table details the shirt sponsors and kit suppliers by year:

Sponsorship naming 
Crvena zvezda has had several denominations through the years due to its sponsorship:

Home arenas

Crvena zvezda plays their domestic home games at the Aleksandar Nikolić Hall, located in the Belgrade municipality of Palilula. The arena, then named Pionir Hall, was built in 1973 in eleven months, by Energoprojekt. Basketball was popular in Yugoslavia at the time, and although the Aleksandar Nikolić Hall hosted many different sports events (volleyball, handball) it became known as a basketball arena. It has a seating capacity of 8,000. The Aleksandar Nikolić Hall is also the home of Zvezda's main rival Partizan.

Crvena zvezda plays their EuroLeague home matches at the Štark Arena, which has a seating capacity of 18,386 for basketball games. Club holds the highest attendance records for three EuroLeague seasons: 2014–15, 2015–16, and 2016–17.

Supporters

Delije is an umbrella name referring to the supporters of various sports clubs that compete under the Red Star Belgrade Sports Society banner. The name is derived from the Serbian word delija, meaning "brave, hero". The name Delije first began to be used by hardcore Red Star supporters during the late 1980s, with the official inauguration taking place on 7 January 1989.

Players

Current roster

Depth chart

Retired numbers

The Zvezda's Stars 
The following players were selected as the Zvezdine zvezde (meaning The Stars of Red Star).

Players on the NBA draft

Team captains

  Nebojša Ilić (1992–1993)
  Aleksandar Trifunović (1993–1996)
  Mirko Pavlović (1996–1997)
  Milenko Topić (1998–1999)
  Saša Obradović (1999–2000)
  Miloš Vujanić (2000–2001)
  Srđan Jovanović (2001–2002)
  Zlatko Bolić (2002–2003)
  Igor Rakočević (2003–2004)
  Goran Jeretin (2004–2006)
  Milan Gurović (2006–2007)
  Tadija Dragićević (2007–2010)
  Vuk Radivojević (2010)
  Boris Bakić (2010–2011)
  Vuk Radivojević (2011–2012)
  Igor Rakočević (2012–2013)
  Marko Simonović (2013–2014)
  Luka Mitrović (2014–2017)
  Branko Lazić (2017–present)

Second-generation players
The following is a list of father-and-son combinations who have played for Crvena zvezda.

Head coaches

History 
There have been 42 head coaches in the club's history. Montenegrin coach Dejan Radonjić is the all-time leader in both regular-season games coached and wins. Nebojša Popović won 10 National Championships, while Radonjić won five National Cups and he is the only head coach who has won multiple Cup tournaments. Radonjić and Bratislav Đorđević won both a National Championship and a National Cup. Also, Crvena zvezda won 5 Adriatic Championships under Radonjić and an ABA Supercup under Milan Tomić. Coaches Radonjić and Tomić won the Adriatic Championship and the National Championship in the same season. In the 2014–15, 2016–17, 2020–21, and 2021–22 seasons, coach Radonjić recorded three titles (Serbian League, Adriatic League, and Serbian Cup). Coach Aleksandar Nikolić won the only European-wide competition in the club's history, the FIBA European Cup Winner's Cup in 1974.

Aleksandar Nikolić, Ranko Žeravica and Svetislav Pešić are members of FIBA Hall of Fame as coaches, while Nikolić is a member of Naismith Memorial Basketball Hall of Fame. American coach Tom Ludwig, hired in 1997, was the first foreign head coach, and the only non-European. Montenegrins Radonjić and Duško Ivanović, and Slovenian Zmago Sagadin were the other foreign head coaches. Head coaches Vladislav Lučić and Aleksandar Trifunović were hired three times.

Head coaches Popović, Aleksandar Gec, Milan Bjegojević, Đorđe Andrijašević, Nikolić, Nemanja Đurić, Strahinja Alagić, Dragiša Vučinić, Zoran Slavnić, Lučić, Stevan Karadžić, Trifunović, Milenko Topić and Saša Obradović were also Crvena zvezda's players. Popović and Vučinić were player-coaches, while Popović, Bjegojević and Topić won the National Championships both as the players and head coaches.

The four-time EuroLeague-winning head coach, Božidar Maljković was an assistant coach for Crvena zvezda in the 1980s. Further notable assistant coaches include Marin Sedlaček, Velibor Radović, and Saša Kosović.

Since November 2022, the head coach has been Duško Ivanović.

Notable head coaches 

  Nebojša Popović (1946–1957)
  Milan Bjegojević (1960–1970)
  Bratislav Đorđević (1971–1973, 1976–1979)
  Aleksandar Nikolić (1973–1974)
  Ranko Žeravica (1979–1986, 1997)
  Vlade Đurović (1986–1988)
  Zoran Slavnić (1988–1991, 1994–1995)
  Duško Vujošević (1991–1992)
  Vladislav Lučić (1992–1994, 1997–1998, 1999–2000)
  Aleksandar Trifunović (2002–2003, 2004–2005, 2009–2010)
  Zmago Sagadin (2003–2004)
  Dragan Šakota (2005–2007, 2019–2020)
  Svetislav Pešić (2008–2009, 2011–2012)
  Dejan Radonjić (2013–2017, 2020–2022)
  Milan Tomić (2018–2019)
  Duško Ivanović (2022–present)

Hall of Famers, greatest players and contributors

Trophies

Youth system

History 
The biggest achievement of the Crvena zvezda youth team is winning the Euroleague NGT in 2014, as well as reaching the finals in 2015 and 2016.

Some of the most notable home-grown players are Zoran Slavnić, a member of the 50 greatest players in the history of FIBA international basketball, as selected in 1991, then Igor Rakočević – the three-time EuroLeague Top Scorer, Peja Stojaković – the NBA All-Star player and FIBA EuroBasket MVP, as well as Vladimir Cvetković and Dragan Kapičić.

Further notable home-grown players include Goran Rakočević, Ivan Sarjanović, Žarko Koprivica, Slobodan Nikolić, Predrag Bogosavljev, Boban Janković, Mirko Milićević, Branislav Prelević, Aleksandar Trifunović, Nebojša Ilić, Saša Obradović, Rastko Cvetković, Nikola Jestratijević, Miloš Vujanić, Vladimir Radmanović, Milutin Aleksić, Milko Bjelica, Luka Bogdanović, Tadija Dragićević, Nemanja Nedović, and Marko Gudurić.

Aleksandar Đorđević (one of 50 Greatest EuroLeague Contributors), Dejan Koturović, Marko Jarić, and Vladimir Micov were members of the club's youth system who have never appeared in a regular-season or playoff game for the first team.

Current staff 
For the 2022–23 season.
 Youth system coordinator: Jovica Antonić
 U19 head coach: Branko Jorović
 U16 head coach: Miloš Šakota
 U14 head coach: Nemanja Novašikić

Management 

The organizational structure of Crvena zvezda has been consisted of Assembly, Presidency, President, Managing Board, Supervisory board, General manager, and disciplinary commission. The Assembly has 35 members elected on a 5-year term, including the chairperson and the deputy chair. The Presidency has 7 officers elected in a 5-year term, including the president. The Managing Board has up to 23 officers, including 7 officers of the Presidency and up to 16 members elected on a 5-year term.

Current officeholders 
The following people are the current officeholders of Crvena zvezda (elections held on 27 December 2021):
 President: Nebojša Čović
 Honorary President: Vladimir Cvetković
 Presidency (7): Nebojša Čović (chair), Branimir Baćović, Marko Kešelj, Dragan Filipović, Đorđe Vučinić, Nebojša Mitrović, and Tomislav Šunjka
 Board President: Dušan Milosavljević
 Board members (21): Dušan Milosavljević (president), Saša Vlaisavljević (vice president), Darko Marinković, Igor Biga, Srđan Stefanović, Miljan Baćović, Kristijan Popović, Filip Volšek, Nikola Tošković, Čedo Božović, Nikola Sebić, Ilija Šetka, Predrag Ćurčić, Toma Sarić, Ljubiša Bulajić, Vladimir Ilić, Branko Stanojević, Đorđe Marović, Simo Carević, Dragan Ninković, and Aleksandar Kostić
 Chairperson of the Assembly: Ljubomir Milić 
 Assembly members (57): Ljubomir Milić (chair), Zoran Milošević (deputy chair), Dragiša Vučinić (deputy chair), Milan Avakumović, Dušan Albijanić, Srboljub Aleksić, Dalibor Arbutina, Momčilo Bajagić, Boris Vuković, Nikola Vučević, Simo Galavić, Milan Gurović, Žarko Dapčević, Bojan Babić, Zaga Žeravica, Ljupče Žugić, Snežana Zorić-Mijalković, Branislav Zrnić, Zoran Ivković, Saša Jakimov, Bora Jakovljev, Zoran Jović, Gordan Kičić, Zoran Kovačević, Vladimir Kozarac, Aleksandar Kojčinović, Vladimir Kuzmanović, Branko Lazić (player), Miodrag Lazić, Vladan Lukić, Vladislav Lučić, Jovo Martinović, Darko Miličić, Stanislav Nikolić, Miloš Ninković, Svetislav Parežanin, Marko Parezanović, Nikola Paunović, Dragan Radovanović, Milan Radovanović, Igor Rakočević, Igor Rašula, Rosa Ristić, Aleksandar Ružičić, Ivan Sarjanović, Marko Simonović, Stevan Sojić, Dejan Sokolović, Aleksandar Stanisavljević, Aleksandar Stanojević, Miroljub Stanojković, Igor Stoimenov, Bojan Tanjević, and Filip Filipović
 General manager: Nemanja Vasiljević 
 Sporting director: Milan Dozet
 Marketing director: Janko Stanković

Presidents
  Mira Petrović (1945)
  Mirko Aksentijević (1945–1950)
  Milorad Sokolović
  Aleksandar Gec (1971–1972)
  Dragiša Vučinić (1991–1994)
  Vojislav Stojaković (1996–2000)
  Nebojša Popović (2000–2001)
  Živorad Anđelković (2001–2005)
  Mirko Petrović (2005–2008)
  Slobodan Vučićević (2008–2010)
  Vladislav Lučić (2010)
  Nebojša Čović (2011–present)

Chairperson of the Assembly
  Rajko Žižić (2001–2003)
  Živorad Anđelković (2006–2008)
  Zoran Drakulić (2008–2010)
  Živorad Anđelković (2011–2013)
  Branislav Đurđević (2013–2014)
  Branimir Baćović (2016–2020)
  Ljubomir Milić (2020–present)

Honorary President 
  Ivo Andrić (1963–1975)
  Vladimir Cvetković (2021–present)

General managers / Directors / Secretary Generals
  Dragan Kapičić (1991–1994)
  Slobodan Mladenović (1990s)
  Igor Žeželj (2001–2005)
  Andrija Kleut (2007–2008)
  Milan Opačić (2008–2010)
  Mirko Pavlović (2010–2015)
  Davor Ristović (2015–2018)
  Filip Sunturlić (2018–2021)
  Nemanja Vasiljević (2022–present)

Sporting directors 
  Miroslav Prelević (late 1990s)
  Ranko Žeravica
  Branko Kovačević (unknown–2000)
  Borislav Džaković (1999, interim)
  Zoran Jovanović (2000–2001)
  Zmago Sagadin (2002–2004)
  Branko Kovačević (mid-2000s) 
  Mirko Pavlović (2015–2017)
  Nebojša Ilić (2017–2019)
  Žarko Čabarkapa (2019–2020)
  Nemanja Vasiljević (2020–2022)
  Milan Dozet (2022–present)

Team managers 
  Nebojša Ilić (2001–present)

Source

Notable players

1940s
 Strahinja Alagić
 Milan Bjegojević
 Aleksandar Gec
 Srđan Kalember
 Aleksandar Nikolić
 Nebojša Popović
 Tullio Rochlitzer
 Milorad Sokolović
 Borislav Stanković
 Vasilije Stojković
1950s
 Đorđe Andrijašević
 Borislav Ćurčić
 Ladislav Demšar
 Dragan Godžić
 Borko Jovanović
 Đorđe Konjović
 Milutin Minja
 Obren Popović
 Branko Radović
1960s
 Vladimir Cvetković
 Sreten Dragojlović
 Nemanja Đurić
 Tihomir Pavlović
 Ratomir Vićentić
1970s
 Dragan Kapičić
 Žarko Koprivica
 Zoran Lazarević
 Goran Rakočević
 Ivan Sarjanović
 Ljubodrag Simonović
 Zoran Slavnić
 Dragiša Vučinić
 Radivoje Živković
1980s
 Zufer Avdija
 Predrag Bogosavljev
 Boban Janković
 Stevan Karadžić
 Branko Kovačević
 Mirko Milićević
 Slobodan Nikolić
 Ivo Petović
 Branislav Prelević
 Zoran Radović
 Rajko Žižić
1990s
 Zlatko Bolić
 Rastko Cvetković
 Dražen Dalipagić
 Vlade Divac
 Nebojša Ilić
 Nikola Jestratijević
 Zoran Jovanović
 Mileta Lisica
 Dragan Lukovski
 Saša Obradović
 Luka Pavićević
 Vladimir Radmanović
 Igor Rakočević
 Zoran Sretenović
 Jovo Stanojević
 Predrag Stojaković
 Dragan Tarlać
 Dejan Tomašević
 Milenko Topić
 Aleksandar Trifunović
 Charles Smith
2000s
 Elmedin Kikanović
 Filip Videnov
 Milko Bjelica
 Omar Cook
 Goran Jeretin
 Tunji Awojobi
 Obinna Ekezie
 Pero Antić
 Nemanja Bjelica
 Tadija Dragićević
 Vladislav Dragojlović
 Milan Gurović
 Marko Kešelj
 Petar Popović
 Vuk Radivojević
 Vladimir Štimac
 Miloš Vujanić
 Andre Owens
 Scoonie Penn
 Lawrence Roberts
 Mike Taylor
2010s
 Blake Schilb
 James Feldeine
 Mathias Lessort
 Maik Zirbes
 Stratos Perperoglou
 Sofoklis Schortsanitis
 Gal Mekel
 Deon Thompson
 Taylor Rochestie
 Mouhammad Faye
 Nemanja Dangubić
 Dejan Davidovac
 Ognjen Dobrić
 Marko Gudurić
 Stefan Jović
 Nikola Kalinić
 Raško Katić
 Ognjen Kuzmić
 Branko Lazić
 Boban Marjanović
 Vasilije Micić
 Luka Mitrović
 Nemanja Nedović
 Marko Simonović
 Jaka Blažič
 Alen Omić
 Lorenzo Brown
 Billy Baron
 Charles Jenkins
 Tarence Kinsey
 Quincy Miller
 Adam Morrison
 DeMarcus Nelson
 Joe Ragland
 Omar Thomas
 Marcus Williams
 Nate Wolters
2020s
 Facundo Campazzo
 Luca Vildoza
 Duop Reath
 Landry Nnoko
 Nikola Ivanović
 Marko Jagodić-Kuridža
 Stefan Marković
 Filip Petrušev
 Miroslav Raduljica
 Quino Colom
 Jordan Loyd

See also 
 List of basketball clubs in Serbia by major honours won

Notes

References

External links

 KK Crvena zvezda official website
 Club info at Adriatic league official site
 Crvena Zvezda Sports Association

Crvena zvezda
 
Basketball teams in Yugoslavia
Basketball teams in Belgrade
Basketball teams established in 1945
1945 establishments in Serbia
EuroLeague clubs